
The following is a list of Playboy Playmates of 1966.  Playboy magazine names their Playmate of the Month each month throughout the year.

January

Judy Tyler (born December 24, 1947, in Los Angeles, California, died June 18, 2013) was Playboy magazine's Playmate of the Month for its January 1966 issue. Her centerfold was photographed by Mario Casilli.

Tyler went into sales following her Playboy days.

June 18, 2013, Judy died from complications of open heart surgery. She was 65 years young).

February

Melinda Windsor (born June 25, 1944, in Akron, Ohio) was the pseudonym used by a 21-year-old student at the University of California at Los Angeles who was Playboy magazine's Playmate of the Month for its February 1966 issue. Her centerfold was photographed by Tony Marco.

Since she used a pseudonym to protect her true identity the biographical data on her Playmate Data Sheet published by Playboy and repeated in this article may not be accurate.

Windsor was photographed by Maynard Frank Wolfe for the January 1967 issue of Playboy and by Morton Tadder for the Fall 1967 issue of VIP magazine.

March

Priscilla Wright (born November 20, 1943) is an American model who was Playboy magazine's Playmate of the Month for its March 1966 issue. Her centerfold was photographed by Mario Casilli.

April

Karla Conway (born July 5, 1946, in Pasadena, California) was the name used by American model and artist Karla Jo Musacchia for her appearance as Playboy magazine's Playmate of the Month for its April 1966 issue.  Her centerfold was photographed by Paul Morton Smith and R. Charleton Wilson.

She has started going by the name Sachi and became an artist. Due to her concern for the environment, she created a turtle logo for companies to use for bags that they make that are both biodegradable and compostable.

May

Dolly Read (born September 13, 1944, in Bristol, England) is an English pinup model and actress. She is best remembered for her appearance in Playboy May 1966 magazine and as the lead character in the motion picture Beyond the Valley of the Dolls. She is sometimes credited as Margaret Read, Dolly Read Martin, or Dolly Martin.

In 1971, Read married American comedian Dick Martin. They divorced in 1974 and were remarried in 1978 and remained married up to Dick Martin's death on May 24, 2008.

June

Kelly Burke (born December 31, 1944) is an American model who was Playboy magazine's Playmate of the Month for its June 1966 issue. Her centerfold was photographed by William Figge.

Burke was born in Los Angeles, California.

According to The Playmate Book, Kelli was pregnant while she was shooting her Playmate centerfold. She also was (at the time) the sister-in-law of 1966 Playmate of the Year Allison Parks.

July

Tish Howard (born July 4, 1946, in New York City) was Playboy magazine's Playmate of the Month for its July 1966 issue. Her centerfold was photographed by William Figge and Ed DeLong. She was a finalist for the title of 1967's Playmate of the Year, along with Susan Denberg and the winner, Lisa Baker.

August

Susan Denberg (born August 2, 1944, in Bad Polzin, Germany (now Połczyn-Zdrój, Poland)) is the stage name of an Austrian model and actress, born Dietlinde Zechner. She was Playboy magazine's Playmate of the Month for its August 1966 issue. Her centerfold was photographed by Peter Gowland. She also was one of the finalists for the title of 1967's Playmate of the Year along with Tish Howard and the eventual winner, Lisa Baker. She was married to Tony Scotti (1965–1968) (divorced).

September

Dianne Chandler (born December 31, 1946, in Berwyn, Illinois) is an American model who served as both a Playboy Playmate of the Month and as a Playboy Bunny. She was Miss September 1966; her centerfold was photographed by Pompeo Posar.

October

Linda Moon (born September 24, 1948, in Michigan) was Playboy magazine's Playmate of the Month for its October 1966 issue.  Her centerfold was photographed by William Graham, Stan Malinowski, and Gene Trindl.

November

Lisa Baker (born March 19, 1944, in Detroit, Texas) is Playboys Playmate of the Month for November 1966, and Playmate of the Year for 1967. Her original pictorial for photographed by William Figge and Ed DeLong.

She was also able to get some work on television, on The Jonathan Winters Show and as the Budweiser girl on The Tonight Show Starring Johnny Carson.  She posed nude for the December 1979 Playboy pictorial "Playmates Forever!"

December

Susan Bernard (born February 11, 1948) was Playboy magazine's Playmate of the Month for its December 1966 issue. Her centerfold was photographed by Mario Casilli and her father Bruno Bernard.

Bernard had a sporadic film and television career, appearing for one season of General Hospital in the late 1960s and in small parts in series television.  In most of her work, she was credited as Sue Bernard.

She posed for Playboy while working on the Russ Meyer film Faster, Pussycat! Kill! Kill!. She was believed to be the first Jewish Playmate of the month, though in recent years Cindy Fuller, Miss May 1959, has claimed that she was the first Jewish Playmate. In an interview in the August 1998 issue of Femme Fatales, Bernard revealed, "I was the first under-18 Jewish virgin who was in the centerfold placed in front of a Christmas tree" and that she'd never been nude in front of anyone other than her mother prior to posing for Cassili, who had been one of her father's apprentices.  Her father was photographer Bruno Bernard. As of November 2008, Bernard was working on three books about her father.

See also
 List of people in Playboy 1960–1969

References

1966-related lists
1966
Playmates Of 1966